Iván Gómez may refer to:

 Iván Gómez (footballer, born 1980), Spanish football goalkeeper
 Iván Gómez (footballer, born 1997), Argentine football defender
 Iván Gómez (mountaineer) (born 1975), Dominican mountaineer